Karilatsi is a village in Põlva Parish, Põlva County in southeastern Estonia.

As of 2011 Census, the settlement's population was 113.

References

External links
Kariltsi village society 
Põlva Peasant Museum in neighbouring Karilatsi village, Kõlleste Parish
Karilatsi Fishery barbecues and fishing

Villages in Põlva County